Gizem Sofuoğlu (née Şahin) is a Turkish karateka. She won one of the bronze medals in the women's team kata event at the 2018 World Karate Championships held in Madrid, Spain. She also won a bronze medal in this event at the 2016 World Karate Championships held in Linz, Austria.

At the 2018 European Karate Championships held in Novi Sad, Serbia, she won one of the bronze medals in the women's team kata event.

Personal life
Sofuoğlu is married to fellow karateka Ali Sofuoğlu.

Achievements

References 

Living people
Year of birth missing (living people)
Place of birth missing (living people)
Turkish female karateka
21st-century Turkish sportswomen